Geniostoma astylum is a species of plant in the Loganiaceae family. It is endemic to French Polynesia.

References

Flora of French Polynesia
astylum
Near threatened plants
Taxonomy articles created by Polbot